The 2006 NCAA Division II football season, part of college football in the United States organized by the National Collegiate Athletic Association at the Division II level, began on September 2, 2006, and concluded with the NCAA Division II Football Championship on December 16, 2006 at Braly Municipal Stadium in Florence, Alabama, hosted by the University of North Alabama.

Grand Valley State defeated Northwest Missouri State in the championship game, 17–14, to win their fourth Division II national title.

The Harlon Hill Trophy was awarded to Danny Woodhead, running back from Chadron State.

Conference changes and new programs

Upper Iowa completed their transition to Division II and became eligible for the postseason. West Georgia changed the name of its athletic teams from Braves to Wolves due to NCAA rules regarding Native American mascots.

Conference standings

Northeast Region

Southeast Region

Northwest Region

Southwest Region

Conference summaries

Postseason

The 2006 NCAA Division II Football Championship playoffs were the 33rd single-elimination tournament to determine the national champion of men's NCAA Division II college football. The championship game was held at Braly Municipal Stadium in Florence, Alabama for the 19th time.

Seeded teams
Bloomsburg 
Chadron State
Grand Valley State
Nebraska–Omaha
North Alabama
North Carolina Central
Northwest Missouri State
Shepherd

Playoff bracket

* Home team    † Overtime

See also
 2006 NCAA Division I FBS football season
 2006 NCAA Division I FCS football season
 2006 NCAA Division III football season
 2006 NAIA football season

References